Rhizotrogus villiersi is a species of beetle in the Melolonthinae subfamily that is endemic to Portugal.

References

Beetles described in 1970
villiersi
Endemic arthropods of Portugal
Beetles of Europe